Oneida Charter Township is a charter township of Eaton County in the U.S. state of Michigan. The population was 3,865 at the 2010 United States Census.

Geography

Communities
Canada Settlement was an area in the township settled by a group of people from London, Ontario in 1836.
 Oneida Center

Demographics

At the 2000 census, there were 3,703 people, 1,352 households and 1,050 families in the township. The racial makeup of the township was 96.81% White, 0.51% African American, 0.46% Native American, 0.30% Asian, 0.03% Pacific Islander, 0.70% from other races, and 1.19% from two or more races. Hispanic or Latino of any race were 2.40% of the population.

There were 1,352 households, of which 35.9% had children under the age of 18 living with them, 70.1% were married couples living together, 5.0% had a female householder with no husband present, and 22.3% were non-families. 18.9% of all households were made up of individuals, and 10.9% had someone living alone who was 65 years of age or older. The average household size was 2.74 and the average family size was 3.13.

26.5% of the population were under the age of 18, 6.7% from 18 to 24, 26.2% from 25 to 44, 28.4% from 45 to 64, and 12.2% who were 65 years of age or older. The median age was 40 years. For every 100 females, there were 99.2 males. For every 100 females age 18 and over, there were 95.8 males.

The median household income was $63,750 and the median family income was $71,891. Males had a median income of $53,813 versus $31,875 for females. The per capita income for the township was $26,787. About 1.9% of families and 2.7% of the population were below the poverty line, including 3.2% of those under age 18 and 0.9% of those age 65 or over.

References

External links
Oneida Charter Township official website

Townships in Eaton County, Michigan
Charter townships in Michigan
Lansing–East Lansing metropolitan area